Fellowship of the Institute of Physics (FInstP) is "the highest level of membership attainable" by physicists who are members of the Institute of Physics (IoP), "for those with a degree in physics or related subject (or equivalent knowledge gained in the workplace) and who have made a significant impact on their sector"; Honorary Fellowship (HonFInstP) is for "exceptional individuals" who can be nominated in recognition of having "contributed to physics generally or to the work of the IOP", working in fields including business, education, research, and policy relating to physics.

Fellows (FInstP)
 fellows include Steven Cowley, Heather Couper, and Philip Campbell. Fellows are entitled to use the post-nominal letters FInstP.

Honorary Fellows (HonFInstP)
The designation of Honorary Fellow of the Institute of Physics, as an honorary title. The award of Honorary Fellowship is "the highest accolade presented by the Institute of Physics to reflect an individual's exceptional services to physics". Awardees are entitled to use the post-nominal letters HonFInstP.

Recipients have included:

References

 
Institute of Physics
Professional certification in science